Lalovi is a village on the island of Upolu in Samoa. It is situated on the north west coast of the island in the political district of Aiga-i-le-Tai.

The population is 504.

References

Populated places in Aiga-i-le-Tai